William Stevens (born 28 June 1991) is a British racing driver, who formerly competed in Formula One, Eurocup Formula Renault 2.0, Toyota Racing Series and the British Formula Renault Championships. In Formula One, he made his debut at the 2014 Abu Dhabi Grand Prix with Caterham F1, replacing Marcus Ericsson for the double points race. During the 2015 season he competed with the Manor Marussia F1 Team.

In 2016, he competed in the Blancpain GT Series and the FIA World Endurance Championship (LMP2) while in 2017, Stevens continues to race for Belgian Audi Club Team WRT racing an Audi R8 LMS in the Blancpain GT Series’ Sprint and Endurance Cups, Blancpain GT Asia Series and the Audi R8 LMS Cup. In the 2017 24 Hours of Le Mans, Stevens raced a Ferrari 488 Italia GTE in the GTE AM category for JMW Motorsport, co-driving alongside fellow Briton Rob Smith and Belgian Dries Vanthoor. They won the class, finishing two laps clear of their closest rivals.

Career

Karting
Stevens started his racing career in 2003 at age of 12 in karts. After one year of racing in the National Cadet championship he joined Rotax Mini Max. He raced in a lot of different championships in Britain and outside, and after finishing 7th in the Rotax class in Super One he joined Formula Renault 2.0.

Formula Renault 2.0
He ended 7th in the 2009 Formula Renault 2.0 UK and 4th in 2010. In 2011 he switched to the Formula Renault 2.0 Eurocup, where he finished 4th.

Formula Renault 3.5

Stevens jumped to the Formula Renault 3.5 Series in 2012, finishing 12th in his first year. In 2013 he scored five podiums in 17 races and ended fourth in the season standings. The driver got two wins and four podiums in 2014 to finish sixth in points.

Formula One

Marussia and Caterham (2014)
In October 2014 Marussia F1 announced that Stevens had joined the team as a reserve driver for the remainder of the 2014 season. They had originally planned to run him in first practice session of the 2014 Japanese Grand Prix; however they were unable to return the relevant paperwork to the FIA Contract Recognition Board in time.

The following month he made his Formula One debut with Caterham F1 at the 2014 Abu Dhabi Grand Prix, having previously tested for the team. He finished the race in 17th place, one lap down. He paid £500,000 for the privilege.

Marussia (2015)

In February 2015, Manor Marussia announced Stevens as one of their drivers whilst bringing substantial funding to the team, along with Roberto Merhi. Marussia attended the Australian Grand Prix but did not compete due to a technical issue. In the Malaysian Grand Prix Stevens drove the Marussia car for the first time in Practice 1. However, he did not compete in qualifying or the race because of a problem with the fuel system. In the Chinese Grand Prix Stevens finished his first race for Marussia in 15th place ahead of his teammate Merhi after being lapped twice by race winner Lewis Hamilton. Stevens finished ahead of Merhi in Bahrain and Spain. He finished behind Merhi in the Monaco Grand Prix in 16th. In the Canadian Grand Prix he qualified behind Merhi but moved up to 17th due to penalties to Jenson Button, Sebastian Vettel and Max Verstappen. In the race on lap 52, Romain Grosjean of Lotus was lapping Stevens but cut his left rear tyre while doing so which caused both drivers to make an emergency pit stop. The mechanics of both Lotus and Marussia had little time to react to their drivers pitting so that meant both Grosjean and Stevens took long pit stops. Stevens complained to his team on the radio about the incident. Grosjean received a 5-second penalty for the collision but Stevens had dropped from being 4 seconds behind Merhi to a minute behind him. However, Merhi was forced to retire on lap 56 after a drive-shaft issue. Stevens eventually finished in 17th place, 4 laps down on race winner Lewis Hamilton. After the race, Grosjean apologised to Stevens for the incident.  During the later races of the season, Merhi was replaced by Alexander Rossi who outpaced Stevens in 3 of 4 races.

WEC and Blancpain (2016)

In February 2016, Manor Motorsport, a team made by former Manor Racing employees John Booth and Graeme Lowdon, decided to compete in the FIA World Endurance Championship, with Stevens and former Manor F3 driver Tor Graves. The following month it was announced that Stevens would dovetail his WEC campaign with racing in the 2016 Blancpain GT Series for the W Racing Team, driving an Audi R8 LMS with René Rast.

Le Mans 24 Hours (2017)
In May 2017 it was confirmed that Stevens would co-drive the JMW Ferrari 488 GTE-Am alongside two Le Mans 'rookies', nineteen-year-old Dries Vanthoor of Holland and British driver Rob Smith. The team's Ferrari 488 was fresh out of the box, making its race debut, and was quickly on the pace; third-quickest in first free-practice. The team focused on fulfilling driver qualification requirements in First Qualifying (8th in GTE-Am, 3:56.890), but pushed on in Second Qualifying, with Dries Vanthoor the first to better the old class lap record (3:54.543). Will Stevens then sliced half a second off this by posting a 3:53.981 to lay claim to provisional class pole. In third and final qualifying the team completed race-preparation of the all-new car, and a succession of yellow flags prevented personal improvements for the JMW drivers. The car lined up 6th in GTE-Am for the race. Stevens drove the first stint, moving through to fourth in class. His co-drivers continued the advance, the team capturing third at 5:40 pm, and then second three hours into the race. Shortly after 10 pm, the #84 JMW Ferrari took the GTE-Am lead, and from there steadily built up an advantage that extended to over two laps at the finish. The car completed 333 laps and crossed the line 27th overall. Stevens set the fastest lap for the JMW Ferrari of 3:54.461.

ELMS and Blancpain (2017) 

Stevens also in 2017 finished 2nd in the Blancpain GT Series Sprint Cup which included his first GT3 win at Zolder with team-mate Markus Winkelhock. Unfortunately he had a rather disappointing season in the Blancpain Gt Series Endurance Cup where his car retired in every race he competed in and he wasn't involved in the 24 hours of Spa the blue riband event of the Blancpain GT Series.After their victory at the 24 hours of Le Mans JMW Motorsport invited Stevens to race in the last 2 races of the European Le Man Series in an attempt to come 1st in the GTE Series Team standings. This attempt was successful as Stevens helped the team come 2nd at Spa-Francorchamps and Algarve which elevated the team to 1st in the GTE standings.

ELMS (2018–present)

In March 2018 Stevens joined the Panis-Barthez LMP2 Team for the 2018 European Le Mans Series and to compete in the 24 Hours of Le Mans.

McLaren F1 (2018–present)
Stevens has worked with McLaren since 2018 as a test and development driver, primarily carrying out simulator work. McLaren announced on 11 July 2022 that Stevens would drive the McLaren MCL35 2021 car at a private test to be held between the 11th and 13th of July at Portimao circuit.

Racing record

Career summary

† As Stevens was a guest driver, he was ineligible for points.
* Season still in progress.

Complete Formula Renault UK results 
(key) (Races in bold indicate pole position) (Races in italics indicate fastest lap)

Complete Eurocup Formula Renault 2.0 results
(key) (Races in bold indicate pole position) (Races in italics indicate fastest lap)

† As Stevens was a guest driver, he was ineligible for points.

Complete Formula Renault 3.5 Series results
(key) (Races in bold indicate pole position) (Races in italics indicate fastest lap)

Complete Formula One results
(key) (Races in bold indicate pole position; races in italics indicate fastest lap)

 Driver did not finish the Grand Prix, but was classified as he completed over 90% of the race distance.

Complete FIA World Endurance Championship results

Complete 24 Hours of Le Mans results

Complete Blancpain GT Series Sprint Cup results

Complete European Le Mans Series results

‡ Half points awarded as less than 75% of race distance was completed.

Complete IMSA SportsCar Championship results
(key)

* Season still in progress.

References

External links

 
 

1991 births
Living people
People from Rochford
English racing drivers
Portuguese Formula Renault 2.0 drivers
24 Hours of Le Mans drivers
FIA World Endurance Championship drivers
Blancpain Endurance Series drivers
British Formula Renault 2.0 drivers
Formula Renault Eurocup drivers
Toyota Racing Series drivers
Formula Renault 2.0 NEC drivers
World Series Formula V8 3.5 drivers
Caterham Formula One drivers
Marussia Formula One drivers
English Formula One drivers
Carlin racing drivers
Sportspeople from Essex
European Le Mans Series drivers
WeatherTech SportsCar Championship drivers
Fortec Motorsport drivers
Manor Motorsport drivers
MP Motorsport drivers
Strakka Racing drivers
W Racing Team drivers
G-Drive Racing drivers
Jota Sport drivers
Wayne Taylor Racing drivers
Karting World Championship drivers
Audi Sport drivers
P1 Motorsport drivers
Starworks Motorsport drivers